The 1980 Bordeaux Open also known as the Grand Prix Passing Shot was a men's tennis tournament played on clay courts at Villa Primrose in Bordeaux, France that was part of the 1980 Volvo Grand Prix. It was the second edition of the tournament and was held from 22 September until 27 September 1980. Third-seeded Mario Martinez won the singles title.

Finals

Singles
 Mario Martinez defeated  Gianni Ocleppo 6–0, 7–5, 7–5
 It was Martinez' first singles title of his career.

Doubles
 John Feaver /  Gilles Moretton defeated  Gianni Ocleppo /  Ricardo Ycaza 6–3, 6–2

References

External links
 ITF tournament edition details

Bordeaux Open
ATP Bordeaux
Bordeaux Open
Bordeaux Open